We Believe: Chicago and its Cubs is a 2009 documentary film about the city of Chicago and her enduring love for the Chicago Cubs directed by John Scheinfeld (The U.S. vs. John Lennon). It was scheduled to be released into theaters during the spring of 2009.

Cast
Appearing in the film are nine current players and celebrities like Lou Piniella, Hugh Hefner, Billy Corgan, Ernie Banks, Joe Mantegna and Ron Santo.

The film was set to be released in theaters and as a DVD in Spring 2010

External links
 Official homepage
 

2009 films
2009 documentary films
2000s sports films
American sports documentary films
Chicago Cubs
Documentary films about Chicago
Documentary films about baseball
2000s English-language films
2000s American films
English-language documentary films